The 1998–99 Trabzonspor season was the 24th consecutive season that the club played in the 1. Lig.

Season summary 

Trabzonspor finished 4th the 1998-99 season. Trabzonspor was included in the Turkish Cup from 6th round. Trabzonspor played against Gaziantepspor in the 6th round. Trabzonspor won the 1st game 5 - 4 against Gaziantepspor but lost 2nd game 3 - 1 and eliminated from the Turkish Cup. Trabzonspor participated UEFA Cup in the 1998-99 season. In the 1st game of the 1st leg Trabzonspor lost 5 - 1 against Wisła Kraków in Kraków. Trabzonspor also lost the 2nd leg 2 - 1 in Trabzon and eliminated from UEFA Cup

Squad

Transfers

In

Out

League table

Scorers

Hat-tricks

1. Lig games

1st half

2nd half

Turkish Cup

UEFA Cup

See also 
 Trabzonspor
 1998–99 1.Lig

Notes

Sources 
 Turkish Football Federation 
 Trabzonspor Official Site

Trabzonspor seasons
Turkish football clubs 1998–99 season